Hellenism in a religious context refers to the modern pluralistic religion practiced in Greece and around the world by several communities derived from the beliefs, mythology and rituals from antiquity through and up to today. It is a system of thought and spirituality with a shared culture and values, and common ritualistic, linguistic and literary tradition. More broadly, Hellenism centers itself on the worship of Hellenic deities, namely the twelve Olympians.

Greeks that identify their religion and way of life with Hellenism are commonly referred to as Εθνικοί Έλληνες (Ethnic Hellenes). Non-Greek devotees of the Greek gods who embody Hellenic ideals are commonly referred to as Hellenists. More generally, someone who worships the Greek gods but does not necessarily adhere to Hellenic ideals, ethos or ritual may be referred to as a "Hellenic" polytheist or pagan. Pagan and Paganism are insulting terms to use when referring to ethnic Hellenes and Hellenic Ethnic Religion respectively. Olympianismos (Olympianism) and Neopaganismos (Neopaganism) are used by the Greek Orthodox Church in a derogatory manner, while the term Dodekatheismos (religion of twelve gods) is used by both Christian critics and some polytheists."

Some academics use the term 'ancient Greek religion' as a catch-all term in Greece, in order to differentiate it from the Orthodox religion which is also sometimes presented as the 'national religion'. Followers of "ancient Greek religion" in Greece argue that the term "ancient" is not appropriate, as their beliefs have been continuously practiced, sometimes secretly, and are still alive today. They also tend to avoid referring to their beliefs as a "religion" in the traditional sense, instead preferring terms such as "religious tradition," "cult," or "worldview," as they do not have sacred texts or dogmas. Even among those who identify as followers of ancient Greek religion, there is a variety of terms used, such as "Hellenic religion," "Hellenic tradition," "Hellenic polytheism," "Hellenic cult," and "Hellenic national religion." The various names can describe groups, and individuals who "reinterpret and reinvent ancient Greek religious practices and identities." within Greece. 

Ancient Greek religion has manifested itself as 'known religion' (γνωστή θρησκεία) in Greece through the names two religious names, Hellenic Ethnic Religion and Ancient Hellenic Religion. Hellenic Ethnic Religion is represented by the Supreme Council of Ethnic Hellenes (Greek: Ύπατο Συμβούλιο των Ελλήνων Εθνικών) while Ancient Hellenic Religion is represented by HELLIN.A.I.S (Hellenic Ancient-Religious Holy Society) (Greek: ΕΛΛΗΝ.Α.Ι.Σ - Ελλήνων Αρχαιοθρήσκων Ιερόν Σωματείον)

Various religious movements reviving or reconstructing ancient Greek religious practices have been publicly emerging since the 1990s. In 2006, Ancient Hellenic Religion, was granted "known religion" status by Greece. In 2017, Greece legally recognized Hellenic Religion as a "known religion." With the status of "known religion" both religions attained certain religious freedoms in Greece, including the freedom to open houses of worship and for clergy to officiate at weddings.

Naming and terminology 

There are no official naming practices for labeling religious expressions deriving themselves from the Hellenic or Hellenistic culture and history in one form or another. The ancient Hellenes did not have a word for 'religion' in the modern sense. Likewise, no known Greek writer classifies either the gods or the cult practices into separate 'religions'. Modern scholarship that speaks of religions of the ancient Greeks, is applying a modern category in a modern way. Instead, for example, Herodotus speaks of the Hellenes as having "common shrines of the gods and sacrifices, and the same kinds of customs."

Some informal naming conventions have developed since the formation of the first Hellenic religious organizations in the 1990s, based on academically accepted descriptive definitions. Hellenism has been employed as a religious identifier for Hellenic Religion in the same manner as Christianity is understood to mean Christian religion. This conflation of Hellenism with or as Hellenic religion in the Anglosphere is the result of English translations of primary sources from Antiquity.

The word Ἑλληνισμός appears in writings of three authors, Sextus Empiricus, Diogenes Laërtius (3rd century CE), and Roman Emperor Julian (331 – 26 June 363). In Sextus Empiricus' "Against the Professors", a criticism of professors of all arts and sciences, Ἑλληνισμός is translated by Robert Gregg Bury as "hellenism". Ἑλληνισμός is not employed in a religious manner, but is used in the context of proper Greek grammar. Likewise in Diogenes Laërtius' "Lives of Eminent Philosophers 7.1. Zeno", Ἑλληνισμός is once again used to talk about Greek language, not religion. In the English translation by Robert Drew Hicks it is rendered as "pure Greek" and "good Greek":

"Ἀρεταὶ δὲ λόγου εἰσὶ πέντε, Ἑλληνισμός, σαφήνεια, συντομία, πρέπον, κατασκευή. Ἑλληνισμὸς μὲν οὖν ἐστι φράσις ἀδιάπτωτος ἐν τῇ...."
There are five excellences of speech—pure Greek, lucidity, conciseness, appropriateness, distinction. By good Greek is meant language faultless in point...

Understanding Julian's usage of Ἑλληνισμός arguably has been lost in translation. The word appears in his letter to Arsacius, High-priest of Galatia. The translator, Wilmer Cave Wright rendered Ἑλληνισμός as "Hellenic religion" in the opening sentence where Julian complains that "The Hellenic religion does not prosper" like he desires. The explicit religious nature of the letter, could be the reason why Ἑλληνισμός was translated as "Hellenic religion" for textual comprehensibility, it is inconclusive at this time. Because of the choice in translation, English speaking polytheists claim Julian used the term to define Ἑλληνισμός as traditional Graeco-Roman religion.

The phrase Hellenic Polytheistic Reconstructionism refers specifically to the methodology used by some practitioners to recreate the religion based on academic sources, rather than the religion itself, and not all Hellenic Polytheists are reconstructionists.

Other terms in common usage by Hellenic polytheists include "Greek reconstructionism" and "Hellenic Traditionalism", but the two are not synonymous.

Theology & Values 
When discussing theology, opinions are divided. Some argue that theology is a fundamental part of the ancient tradition and an integral part of ancient philosophy. They argue that the philosophical texts of ancient philosophers discussing religion and the existence of gods form the theology of Hellenic religion. Some groups, such as YSEE, have published materials about the ancient Greek religion that include a section on theology and praxis, but without specific reference to philosophers or philosophical movements. Others disagree that theology is a central part of the ancient religion and practice. They argue that since they do not have any dogmas or holy books, theology only relates to philosophical movements such as Epicureanism, and that at the community level, they reject any association with specific philosophical paths. They see any such choice as a personal one, not one that should be endorsed by a group or the community, as is the case with monotheistic religions. They consider the rituals based on mythology, with myths forming the basis of their festivals, and there is no theology behind them.

This perspective does not mean that members of the community or broader Hellenic religious milieu can do whatever they please. It is acknowledged that there are certain principles, rooted in tradition, that should be followed and accepted by members. As one follower stated, "you can't be dogmatic in our circles, because we don't have a dogma [laughing], … there are of course some guiding principles that one needs to follow because they are based on tradition, these are things that you need to follow". This means that values are still present and should be adhered to. In some cases, they are openly stated in the group’s texts:“The values that govern and guide Labrys religious community are: Eusebia (Piety), in our relationship with the Gods; Organikotis (Kinship), in our relationships within the Community; Dikaiosyne (Justice), in terms of members’ relations within the Community and also as a guiding principle in the conduct of the community as a whole towards third parties. The members of Labrys religious community also aim at achieving Eudaimonia [happiness] through attaining freedom, autonomy and self-sufficiency”.It is clear that certain values are held in common within the community and should be accepted by members, but there is no such requirement for theological or philosophical beliefs. As one member stated, "it doesn't matter if you have read Homer or Hesiod. The most important is piety. To be possessed by Gods and be pious is the A and Z." Piety was mentioned by most, if not all, members as one of the most important values that people should follow in their everyday lives.

Prominent concepts include, but are not restricted to: Eusebeia (piety), Arete (virtue), and Xenia (hospitality). These are rooted in the various ancient Greek values concepts that they look to for guidance and inspiration from the Tenets of Solon, the Delphic maxims, the Golden verses of Pythagoras, Epicurean philosophy, the ethics of Aristotle, Stoic philosophy and more.

Eusebeia 

Eusebeia (Εὐσέβεια) is often translated as piety or reverent conduct (towards gods or parents), reverence, respect. Eusebeia is the basic practice of Hellenic Religion, fundamental in every way. Eusebeia is the attitude and practice of showing respect and reverence to the Gods and parents. The Delphic Maxims say "Follow God" (Έπου θεώ), "Worship the Gods" (Θεούς σέβου), and "Respect Your Parents" (Γονείς αίδου).

Arete 

Arete (Ἀρετή) is often translated as excellence or moral virtue. Arete is intrinsic to the concept of living up to one's potential. For modern Hellenists, arete is one of the most important virtues, and it is believed that cultivating it will lead to a good life of happiness and prosperity. Cultivating arete is not limited to just one domain, but also refers to the improvement of all aspects of one's existence.

In the Iliad and Odyssey of Homer, "arete" is used mainly to describe heroes and nobles and their mobile dexterity, with special reference to strength and courage, but it is not limited to this. Penelope's arete, for example, relates to co-operation, for which she is praised by Agamemnon. The excellence of the gods generally included their power, but, in the Odyssey (13.42), the gods can grant excellence to a life, which is contextually understood to mean prosperity.

Xenia 

Xenia (Ξενία) is the concept of hospitality and is sometimes translated as 'guest-friendship' or 'ritualized friendship'. It is an institutionalized relationship, rooted in generosity, gift exchange, and reciprocity; fundamental aspects of xenia. Historically, hospitality towards foreigners (Hellenes not of your polis) and guests was a moral obligation. Hospitality towards foreign Hellenes honored Zeus Xenios (and Athene Xenia) patrons of foreigners. In aristocratic circles, as early as the Homeric epics, it was as a sort of fictitious kinship, cemented not only by ties of hospitality and gift exchange but by an obligation to promote the interests of the xenos. Theoxenia is a theme in Greek mythology in which human beings demonstrate their virtue or piety by extending hospitality to a humble stranger (xenos), who turns out to be a disguised deity (theos) with the capacity to bestow rewards.

Offerings and rituals 
Offerings and libations are considered sacred integral acts within worship. There are several types of offerings that are performed, sacrifices, votive offerings and Libations.

Devotees are divided upon the question of animal sacrifice. Some are fine with the practice, while others do not engage in the practice at all. Some instead offer symbolic food of the animal that is sacrificed instead of the animal, often though not exclusively fruit, bread, or cakes.

Beliefs 
Hellenism has historically been a pluralistic religion with beliefs ranging between polytheism, animism and monism, although a Hellenist may hold beliefs that fall into all of these categories. Additionally, there are other interpretations of divinity in line with Hellenistic philosophies, like Epicureanism. Hellenism is, in practice, primarily centered around polytheistic and animistic worship.
 
Devotees worship the Greek gods, which are the Olympians, divinities and spirits of nature (such as nymphs), underworld deities (chthonic gods) and heroes. Both physical and spiritual ancestors are greatly honored. The gods exhibit both universal and local qualities. For the Greeks, "their gods were at the same time universal, found everywhere and powerful over the whole world, and intensely local, manifesting themselves in particular places."

Festivals 

There are many festivals throughout the year that many seek to celebrate, where the dates are often set by the lunisolar Attic calendar. The festivals typically commemorate events in Greek history, honoring deities that the festivals celebrate, and connote spiritual themes. The celebrations incorporate religious themes, arts, sacrifices and offerings, family get togethers and feasts. Popular sacred days are Deipnon, Noumenia and Agathos Daimon.

Hellenic festivals include:

 Anthesteria
 Lenaia
 Dionysia
 Thargelia
 Arrephoria
 Kronia
 Aphrodisia
 Panathanaia
 Herakleia
 Genesia
 Pyanepsia
 Thesmophoria
 Khalkeia
 Rural Dionysia
 Haloa
 Elaphebolia
 City Dionysia

Relationship to ancient Greek religion 

The majority of modern historians agree that the religion practiced by the ancient Greeks had been extinguished by the 9th century CE at the latest and that there is little to no evidence that it survived (in public form at least) past the Middle Ages. (In certain isolated areas it survived until the 12th century, see Tsakonia and Maniots) Greek  member Panagiotis Marinis, has claimed that the religion of ancient Greece survived throughout the intervening centuries, and some claim they were raised in families that practiced this religion.

The revival of Hellenic religious identity is typically only part of a larger social movement of re-Hellenizing Greek identity in a comprehensive way, not only religious. This re-Hellenization movement is the current iteration of previous attempts to revive Hellenism. The first to promote such efforts was the late Byzantine philosopher Georgios Gemistus Plethon in the 15th century. It was in Mystras, in the Despotate of the Morea, that Plethon formed a 'circle' of students. It is through Plethon and his students, that many ethnic Greeks today trace their teachings and practices and give credit for tradition's survival to the present day.

Two notable students of Plethon include the historian Laonikos Chalkokondyles and Bessarion. Bessarion, educated in neoplatonism, was considered for the papacy twice. In a letter recounting the news of his teacher's death, Bessarion says that Plethon has left to "dance with the Olympian Gods" (να χορέψει μαζί με τους Ολυμπίους Θεούς) and honors Plethon by claiming him to be the reincarnation of Plato based on the  "teachings of the Pythagoreans and Plato about the endless ascent and descent of souls" (διδαχές των Πυθαγορείων και του Πλάτωνα περί ατέλειωτης ανόδου και καθόδου των ψυχών).

In 1458, just a few years after the death of Plethon, Michael Tarchaniota Marullus was born near the site of ancient Sparta in the Despotate of the Morea or in Constantinople. Both of Marullus's parents were Greek exiles who had fled from Constantinople when it fell to the Turks in 1453, and he always proudly called himself a Greek. Marullus was a poet and stratioti-soldier. Among his works, Marullus composed a collection of hymns, the Hymni naturales, in which he celebrates the Olympian pantheon. Bartolomeo Scala, his father-in-law, was a member of the Platonic Academy in Florence, Italy.So, my good king of the gods,

the gloomy fate, unfortunately, I could not escape,

to practice as a Hellene

the cult of my fathers

in a non-Hellenic language,

(Hymn to Hermes)Validating the relationship between Hellenic Ethnic Religion and the Ancient Greek Religion for 'continuity' is difficult as an outsider to the tradition, argued Vlassis G. Rassias. In the 19th century, many, especially German scholars, who were otherwise remarkable scholars, made the huge mistake of reconstructing a theology from the works of Homeros, who is only a poet. Hesiodos, on the other hand, who also engages in theogony, can also be seen as theology. But his works are not set in stone either. We see that when we look at Georgios Gemistos-Plethon, at the beginning of the 15th century who is the link between the ancients and us, and who demonstrates an underground continuation that has never been broken. In one of his invocations to Zeus, Plethon presents him – to the surprise of all who see things statically – as the father of Poseidon and Kronos. The German scholar of the 19th century or modern man, who doesn't even know what tradition means, begins at this point to muse and wonder over Plethon's words. In the end, many of them come to the crazy conclusion that Plethon must be assessed as a heretic. Though when Plethon's presentation of Zeus as the 'father' of Poseidon and Kronos is compared to the Derveni papyrus (discovered in 1962), Plethon appears less the heretic. The Derveni Papyrus recounts an Orphic cosmology, one in which the world of today is Zeus’ creation. The new order of the world arises from Zeus after he swallows the severed phallus, the last act in a series of overthrowings of the ruling figure. In doing this, Zeus contained all things within himself and remade the world and regenerated all the Gods and Goddess once more, being King and 'father' to all things. This aligns with the writings of Plethon. In the Book of Laws, Zeus "existed from all eternity," "not born of any other...he is self-father [αὐτοπάτορα]...has no other father than himself...he is the father and the eldest creator [δημιουργὸν] of all things." The other gods in the Greek pantheon are divided according "to divine nature [θεότητι] into the second and third orders, the first of which are the children of Zeus, his creations, and the second are the children of his children, the creations of his creations."

Emically speaking, "revival" accurately describes the religious activity occurring in Greece and around the world since one of the main hallmarks is group gatherings and public festival celebrations. Etic observations from a distance by classical scholars, describe contemporary practices as inauthentic and therefore irrelevant or remain open on the issue. British classicist Mary Beard criticized Greek Hellenists worshippers, saying, "until these eager neo-pagans get real and slaughter a bull or two in central Athens, I shan’t worry that they have much to do with ancient religion at all", later commented that, "I think I was really responding to the claims made by this group that they were reviving ancient paganism. I am absolutely ok with the idea that religions change. I was reacting to their claims to be a modern version of ancient 'paganism'." American classicist, Sarah Iles Johnston affirmed contemporary practice. "The bricolage and re-imaginings of contemporary Pagans is not entirely different from that of ancient Greek religious culture and that even classical scholars inevitably re-imagine the gods." Revivalists view the tradition as a living, changing religion. Hellenic Revivalism allows room for practitioners to decide what feels right to them, and to adapt historical religious practices to modern life.

Hellenists and other self described pagans/polytheists typically engage in reconstructionism, a methodology that attempts to accurately base modern religious practice on the imitation of culturally and historically genuine examples of ancient religious practices. The term is frequently used in the United States to differentiate between syncretic and eclectic Neopagan movements, and those based on the traditions, writings, history, and mythology of a specific ancient polytheistic culture. The Supreme Council of Ethnic Hellenes have made a clear distinction between themselves and the Neopagan movements, and identify some 'Hellenic' groups as "simply disguised as 'Hellenes' for reasons that exist hidden within the depths of their own minds."

History

18th century
During the 18th century, several notable authors and freethinkers embraced Ancient Greek religion to some extent, studying and translating ancient works of theology and philosophy, and in some cases composing original hymns and devotionals to the Ancient Greek pantheon. The English author John Fransham (1730–1810) was one example, considered an eccentric by his peers, who was also referred to as a pagan and a polytheist. In Fransham's 1769 book The Oestrum of Orpheus, he advanced a theology similar to that of the Neoplatonists: that the first cause of existence is uncreated and indestructible, but not intelligent, and that the universe is shaped by "innumerable intelligent powers or forces, 'plastic and designing,' who ruled all sublunary affairs, and may most fitly be designated by the nomenclature of the Hellenic theology." Despite his apparent belief in the Hellenic gods, Fransham does not seem to have been particularly devoted to their worship. According to an 1875 profile in Fraser's Magazine, Franshem's "libations to the Penates found their way down his own throat, and when he sacrificed a fowl to 'Esculapius it was usually in the form of chicken-broth for his supper."

Another example of an 18th-century literary figure who may have considered himself a Hellenist was Thomas Taylor (1758–1835), who produced the first English translations of many neoplatonic philosophical and religious texts. Taylor was widely known as the "English Platonist", and rumors existed that he had produced anonymous pamphlets advocating a return to a sort of pagan religion (these rumors have been debunked by modern scholars). Though the extent of his actual devotion to Ancient Greek spirituality remains unknown, brief descriptions written by others about him tend to portray him as a sincerely devout polytheist. One such sketch, written by Isaac D'Israeli, describes Taylor delaying answering his door until he has finished his mid-day hymn to Apollo, and reports that his study contained a hanging globe of clear glass, representing Zeus, that scattered sunbeams he would use to read and write, shifting his position in the room to follow them throughout the day.

In 1779, the German writer Johann Wolfgang von Goethe wrote in his diary that “the beautiful gods continue to visit me.”   He did not profess a literal belief in the deities of Classical Greece, rather perceiving them to be poetic symbols of his own deepest experience.

His work inspired a limited number devotees. The most notable was Godefroi Izarn, the Marquis de Valadi, a young member of a wealthy French family who adopted a "Pythagorean mode of life". In 1788, Valadi traveled to England in order to convince an unnamed "gentleman of eminence in the literary world" to become the head of a new Pythagorean sect, assuring him that Valadi would help him find numerous followers. He refused, and suggested Valadi learn Greek and become the head of the sect himself. Valadi began his studies at Glasgow, where he learned of Taylor, to whom he wrote in a letter:

"My determination was to go and live in North America, and there to keep a school of temperance and love, in order to preserve so many men from the prevailing vices of brutal intemperance and selfish cupidity ... There I would devoutly erect altars to my favourite Gods: Dioscuri, Hector, Aristomenes, Pan, Orpheus, Epaminondas, Pythagoras, Pluto, Timoleon, Marcus Brutus and his Portia, and above all, Phoebus, the God of my hero Julian ..."

Valadi paid Taylor to live in his house and study under him, but his tenure as Taylor's disciple was short lived. He returned to France to fight in the French Revolution in 1789 (he reportedly said, "I came over Diogenes. I am going back Alexander."), and was executed by guillotine in December 1793.

19th century

The literary and artistic movement known as Romanticism promoted notions of the masterless personal soul, a heightened regard for nature and an interest in supernatural themes, including both magic and Pagan, especially Classical Greek, religion.  Many proponents of Romanticism wrote poems inspired by figures of Greek mythology and in 1821 the poet Percy Bysshe Shelley wrote to his friend Thomas Jefferson Hogg:

I am glad that you do not neglect the rites of the true religion.  Your letter awoke my sleeping devotions, and the same evening I ascended alone the high mountain behind my house, and suspended a garland, and raised a small turf altar to the mountain-walking Pan.

20th century
In the early 20th century, several neopagan groups were formed, often incorporating elements of ancient Greek religion and honoring Greek gods, but with heavily syncretic elements drawn from Hermeticism and 19th century folklore studies. Most prominent of these modern traditions are Thelema and Wicca, though Feraferia (an American tradition founded in the 1970s by Fred Adams) places heavier emphasis on a more Hellenistic style of worship and on the Greco-Roman pantheon of gods. One Wiccan organization in the United States, the Aquarian Tabernacle Church, began to host a spring festival based on the Eleusinian Mysteries in 1985, which has continued to be held every year through the present day.

During the 1970s, some began to reject the influence of Hermeticism and other heavily syncretic forms of Greek religion in preference of practices reconstructing earlier or more original forms of Hellenic worship. Early revivalists of Hellenic religion tended to be individuals working alone, and early attempts to organize adherents into larger groups failed. The first successful revival attempt was made by the Supreme Council of Ethnikoi Hellenes (or YSEE). In 1993, a variety of adherents to the Hellenic religion in Greece and elsewhere came together and began the process of organization. This resulted in a "Hellenic National Assembly", initiated at a gathering in southern Olympus on 9 September 1995. The process culminated with the formal establishment of the YSEE as a non-profit in Greece, in June 1997.

In the 1990s and 2000s, as the practice of the ancient Greek religion (also known as Hellenic religion) began to increase in popularity, the Orthodox Church viewed it as a significant threat and established a special committee, composed of Orthodox Metropolitans, priests, and university professors from divinity schools, to study ancient cults and neopaganism. They also organized conferences, published articles and texts, and uploaded information to the internet, all with the goal of arguing that the ancient Greek religion is a dangerous, idolatrous cult with strange beliefs and practices, possibly even having connections to Satanism, and that Greek people should avoid it at all costs. The Orthodox Church also emphasized that the only true and accepted traditional religion in Greece is and should be Orthodox Christianity, the religion of the forefathers.

21st century and official recognition

2004 Olympics controversy

The 2004 Summer Olympics stirred up several disputes concerning Hellenic polytheistic religion.
 Professor Giorgos Dontas, president of the Archaeological Society of Athens expressed public outrage at the destruction of ancient archaeological sites around the Parthenon and Acropolis in preparation for the games.
 Prior to the Olympic Games, MSNBC correspondent Rehema Ellis in a story called It's Greek to Me: Group Tries to Restore Pagan Worship documented the vandalism and arson of a bookstore in Athens which sold books promoting ancient Greek religion. She also interviewed several adherents who were upset about the current state of affairs in Greece. Ellis said: "A contrast in this place where the Olympic Games were created to honour Zeus – now those praying to the ancient gods are criticized for putting too much faith in the past."
 The Greek Society of the Friends of the Ancients objected to the commercial use of Athena and Phevos as the official mascots of the 2004 Summer Olympics held in Athens. They felt that the caricatured representations of the Greek gods Athena and Phoebus were disrespectful and culturally insensitive. In a BBC Radio interview on 26 June 2004, Dr. Pan. Marinis President of the Societas Hellenica Antiquariorum said that the mascots "mock the spiritual values of the Hellenic civilization by degrading these same holy personalities that were revered during the ancient Olympic Games. For these reasons we have proceeded to legal action demanding the punishment of those responsible."

Recognition and places of worship

In May 2006 an Athens court granted official recognition to the veneration of the Ancient Greek pantheon. Soon afterwards, on 22 January 2007, the Hellenist group Ellinais held a ceremony at the historic Temple of Olympian Zeus in Athens. It was the first such rite performed at the temple since the ancient Greek religion was outlawed by the Roman government in the late 4th century. The ceremony involved participants dressed as ancient warriors who left their swords and spears outside the sacred site, to represent the laying down of arms before the Olympic games. The BBC referred to the event as a show of "intentional publicity". The event caught the attention of the Greek Orthodox Church. Reporters at the event suggested the church might step up their opposition to the legitimizing of Hellenism. Father Eustathios Kollas, who presided over a community of Greek Orthodox priests, said: "They are a handful of miserable resuscitators of a degenerate dead religion who wish to return to the monstrous dark delusions of the past." Despite the 2006 court ruling, the Greek Ministry of Culture and Sports continued to disallow ceremonies of any kind at archaeological sites, and some early 21st century Hellenic rituals therefore took the form of protests. In August 2008, a group of adherents, again organized by Ellinais, gathered at the Acropolis both to give libations and other offerings to the goddess Athena, and to protest the removal of architectural pieces from the temples to a new museum at the site.

The first modern Hellenic temple dedicated to the Hellenic gods was started in 1994 just outside Thessaloniki in the village of Oraiokastro and completed in 2009. Another temple, dedicated to Alexander and the Earth opened in the nearby village of Mesaia in 2019.

A modern Hellenic temple in Athens is still in the planning stages, and worshippers meet at a temporary temple at the headquarters of the Supreme Council of Ethnikoi Hellenes (YSEE) at an apartment building on Aristotelous street in central Athens.

Organizations in Greece and demographics

Ancient Greek religion originated in and is practiced in Greece and has inspired religious worship in other countries. Leaders of the movement claimed in 2005 that there are as many as 2,000 adherents to the Hellenic tradition in Greece, with an additional 100,000 who have "some sort of interest". No official estimates exist for devotees worldwide. Outside Greece, religious organizations began to emerge around 1998, with some individuals claiming to have been engaging in some form of traditional practice since the 1970s.

The first Greek organization to openly support the religious revival of Hellenic religion was Ύπατο Συμβούλιο των Ελλήνων Εθνικών (Supreme Council of Ethnikoi Hellenes or YSEE), established in 1997, and is publicly active. YSEE is a founding member of the World Congress of Ethnic Religions (now European Congress of Ethnic Religions) and hosted the seventh annual WCER Congress in June 2004. With branches also in the United States, Canada, Australia, and Germany, their level of real world public activity, and actual membership levels, the Supreme Council of Ethnikoi Hellenes can be argued to be the defining lead organization for the public revival movement. YSEE is also a member of the European Union's action program to combat discrimination. The organization primarily refers to the religion as the "Ethnic Polytheistic" or "genuine Hellenism" and its practitioners as Ethnikoi Hellenes, "Ethnic [National] Hellenes". YSEE uses the terms "traditional", "ethnic", and "genuine" to refer to their religious practices. Hellenic polytheist author Vlassis G. Rassias has written a popular series of books on "Christian persecutions against the Hellenes," while the Athens-based group Ellinais emphasizes "world peace and the brotherhood of man."

Another active organization based in Greece, the  religious community was founded in 2008. Labrys has focused primarily on the religious aspects of Hellenism or Hellenic polytheism, avoiding anti-Christian rhetoric and politics, establishing weekly public rituals and engaging in other aspects of practical promotion of polytheism like theater and music. Labrys has also promoted among Hellenes worldwide the need to actively practice household worship and the idea that family and community should be the starting points of religious practice. The community has been organizing since 2008 the largest festival in Athens and also actively participates and supports the religious aspects of the oldest Hellenic festival in Greece, Prometheia which is held every year on Mount Olympus. The Labrys religious community has published a book.

Other organizations 
Founded in the United States in 2001, Hellenion identifies its practices as "Hellenic Pagan Reconstructionism" and emphasizes historical accuracy in its mission statement. Hellenion does not provide official membership numbers to the public, but an unofficial estimate of 43 members was made for 2007 and approximately 100 members for 2017. though this number can only give the roughest approximation, as Hellenion offers hardship waivers to those who cannot afford the typical membership fees. In early 2010, the organization reported 1 demos (fully chartered local congregation) and 6 proto-demoi (start-up congregations not fully chartered with less than 3 members) established, which offer rituals and other events for members and frequently for the public as well. Two of the six proto-demoi cannot be independently verified to exist. Hellenion offers legal clergy training, basic adult religious education classes, and other educational/training courses for its members.

Another American group, Elaion, was founded in 2005 after members of other groups grew dissatisfied with what was, in their view, a de-emphasis on Hellenic ethics, philosophy, poetry, and art, and a re-emergence of "occult" doctrines among some practitioners. Elaion aimed to create an organization that emphasized ethics, piety, and "right-living", which they initially termed "Traditionalist Hellenismos". No reported numbers for current membership levels are known to exist. Among the various modern Stoic philosophical groups, many equate Zeus with Divine Providence, or Divine Logos. Among the modern Epicurean philosophical groups, Society of Epicurus accepts the ancient, naturalistic, polytheistic view of the Epicurean gods as one of three legitimate modern interpretations of Epicurean theology.

In Brazil, there are some religious groups, in different states. In addition, in Portuguese language, there is the website of RHB – Reconstrucionismo Helênico no Brasil, built since 2003 by Brazilian members of Hellenion and other international groups, such as the American Neokoroi and the Greek Thyrsos.

See also 

 Hellenism

 Athenian calendar
 Dionysian Mysteries
 Ellinais
 Epicureanism
 Family tree of the Greek gods
 Gemistus Pletho
 Greco-Roman mysteries
 Greek deities
 Greek hero cult
 Greek mythology in popular culture
 Hellenistic philosophy
 Hellenistic religion
 Homeric Hymns
 Interpretatio graeca
 I Still Worship Zeus
 List of Ancient Greek temples
 Orphism (religion)
 Persecution of pagans in the late Roman Empire
 Platonism
 Pyrrhonism
 Pythagoreanism
 Religion in Modern Greece
 Stoicism
 Supreme Council of Ethnic Hellenes
 Twelve Olympians

 Related systems and religions

 European Congress of Ethnic Religions
 Feraferia
 Gaianism
 Greco-Buddhism
 Hermeticism
 Indo-Greek religions
 Kemetism
 List of modern pagan temples
 Milinda Pañha
 Modern paganism
 Mos maiorum
 Neopaganism in Latin Europe
 Old Norse religion
 Polytheistic reconstructionism
 Reconstructionist Roman religion
 Religion in ancient Rome
 Roman imperial cult
 Wicca

References 
 Notes

 Citations

Further reading

External links

Greek organizations
 Ancient Hellenic Religion (Greek)
Thyrsos – Hellenes Ethnikoi (Greek and English)
 Labrys (available in Greek only with some text in English)
 Elaion
 Orphism (English)
 Supreme Council of Ethnikoi Hellenes (YSEE) (English version)
 Australian Ethnikoi Hellenes (branch of YSEE)
 Hellenes Ethnikoi in Canada (branch of YSEE)
 Supreme Council of National Greeks America (branch of YSEE)

American organizations 

 Hellenion

FAQs and articles
 Hellenic Household Worship by Christos Pandion Panopoulos for LABRYS polytheistic community
 The Cauldron Hellenic polytheism FAQ by Andrew Campbell
 Kalash: The Lost Tribe of Alexander the Great – a possible continuous Hellenic Polytheistic tradition.
 Tropaion: researching ancient Greek religion – an academic-based weblog studying and researching Hellenic polytheism.
 Frequently asked questions about the Ethnic Hellenic religion and tradition by YSEE

1990s establishments in Greece
Modern paganism in Greece
Polytheism